The  is a Japanese samurai family who were daimyo and an important political force in the unification of Japan in the mid-16th century. Though they had the climax of their fame under Oda Nobunaga and fell from the spotlight soon after, several branches of the family continued as daimyo houses until the Meiji Restoration. After the Meiji Restoration, all four houses of the clan were appointed Viscount in the new system of hereditary peerage.

History

Origins
The Oda family in the time of Nobunaga claimed descent from the Taira clan, by Taira no Chikazane, a grandson of Taira no Shigemori (1138–1179).

Taira no Chikazane established himself at Oda (Echizen Province) and took its name. His descendants, senior retainers of the Shiba clan (Seiwa Genji), shugo (governors) of Echizen, Owari and other provinces, followed the latter to Owari Province and received Inuyama Castle in 1435. This castle was built towards 1435, by Shiba Yoshitake who entrusted its safety to the Oda family. The Oda had been shugo-dai (vice-governor) for several generations.

Independence
In 1452, after the death of Shiba Yoshitake the vassals of the Shiba, like the Oda in Owari Province and the Asakura clan in Echizen Province, refused the succession of Shiba Yoshitoshi (1430–1490) and supported Shiba Yoshikado (died ca. 1480), and began to divide the large domains of their suzerains among themselves, and had become gradually independent in the domains which had been ceded to them. In 1475, the Oda had occupied the greater portion of Owari Province, but the Shiba would continue to try to regain authority until Shiba Yoshikane (1540–1600), who had to leave Owari.

The other famous castle of the Oda is Kiyosu Castle, built between 1394 and 1427 by Shiba Yoshishige who entrusted the castle to the Oda clan, and named Oda Toshisada vice-governor of the province. Toshisada had four sons. The fourth son, Nobusada, who lived in Katsubata Castle, was the father of Nobuhide and the grandfather of Oda Nobunaga.

Nobunaga's reign
Nobuhide took Nagoya Castle in 1525 (it was given to Nobunaga in 1542), and built Furuwatari Castle. Oda Nobutomo held Kiyosu Castle, but he was besieged and killed in 1555 by his nephew Oda Nobunaga who operated from Nagoya Castle. This led to the family being divided into several branches, until the branch led by Oda Nobunaga eclipsed the others and unified its control over Owari.

Then turning to neighboring rivals, it, one by one achieved dominance over the Imagawa, Saitō, Azai, Asakura, Takeda and other clans, until Nobunaga held control over central Japan. However, Nobunaga's plans for national domination were thwarted when he fell victim to the treachery of his vassal Akechi Mitsuhide who forced Nobunaga into suicide during the Incident at Honnō-ji in the summer of 1582. The Oda remained titular overlords of central Japan for a short time, before being surpassed by the family of one of Nobunaga's chief generals, Hashiba Hideyoshi.

Edo period
Though the Oda were effectively eclipsed by Toyotomi Hideyoshi following Nobunaga's death, it is not often known that the Oda continued to be a presence in Japanese politics. One branch of the family became hatamoto retainers to the Tokugawa shōgun, while other branches became minor daimyō lords. As of the end of the Edo period, these included Tendō Domain (also known as Takahata Domain, Dewa Province, 20,000 koku), Yanagimoto han (Yamato Province, 10,000 koku), Kaiju han (also known as Shibamura han; Yamato Province, 10,000 koku), and Kaibara han (Tanba Province, 20,000 koku).

During the reign of the daimyō Nobutoshi, the Oda of Tendō Domain were signatories to the pact that created the Ōuetsu Reppan Dōmei.

After Meiji Restoration 
After the Meiji Restoration in 1871, the feudal domains were abolished, and all the four houses of the Oda clan were appointed Viscount in the new hereditary peerage (kazoku).

Descendants
Descendants of the Oda clan can be found throughout Japan, mainly in the south and southwest.

Notable figures 

 Oda Chikazane (ca. 13th century)
 Oda Nobuhide (1510–1551)
 Oda Nobuhiro (died 1574)
 Oda Nobunaga (1534–1582)
 Oda Nobuyuki (1536–1557)
 Oda Nobukane (1548–1614)
 Oda Nagamasu (1548–1622)
 Oda Nobuharu (1549–1570)
 Oda Nobuzumi (1555–1583)
 Oda Nobutada (1557–1582)
 Oda Nobutaka (1558–1583)
 Oda Nobukatsu (1558–1630)
 Hashiba Hidekatsu (羽柴 秀勝, 1567–1593)
 Oda Katsunaga (1568–1582)
 Oda Hidekatsu (織田 秀雄, 1583–1610)
 Oda Hidenobu (1580–1605)
 Oda Nobutoshi (1853–1901)
 Oda Nobunari (1987–)

Notable female members 
Oichi (1547–1583)
Lady Otsuya
Tokuhime
Kitsuno
Nōhime
Dota Gozen

Clan retainers

Senior retainer families
 Hirate clan
 Takigawa clan
 Sakuma clan
 Fuwa clan
 Hayashi clan
 Shibata clan
 Niwa clan
 Maeda clan
 Sassa clan

Notable retainer families
 Akechi clan
 Hashiba clan
 Tokugawa clan

Nobunaga's notable retainers 

Senior retainers in Owari Province
 Hirate Masahide
 Hayashi Hidesada
 Murai Sadakatsu
 Kawajiri Hidetaka
 Mizuno Nobumoto
 Sakuma Nobumori
 Shibata Katsuie
 Takigawa Kazumasu
 Mori Yoshinari
 Sakai Masahisa
 Niwa Nagahide
 Ikeda Tsuneoki
 Sassa Narimasa
 Maeda Toshiie
 Toyotomi Hideyoshi
 Hachisuka Masakatsu
 Hori Hidemasa
 Sakuma Morimasa
 Yamauchi Katsutoyo
 Hasegawa Hidekazu
 Naitō Shōsuke
 Harada Naomasa
 Yanada Masatsuna
 Ōta Gyūichi
 Iio Sadamune

Others
 Takenaka Hanbei
 Kuroda Yoshitaka
 Akechi Mitsuhide
 Ujiie Bokuzen
 Inaba Yoshimichi
 Andō Morinari
 Matsunaga Hisahide
 Kuki Yoshitaka
 Kani Saizō
 Kanamori Nagachika
 Gamō Katahide
 Gamō Ujisato
 Mori Ranmaru
 Asakura Kageakira
 Fuwa Mitsuharu
 Araki Murashige
 Hirate Kiyohide
 Hosokawa Fujitaka
 Ikeda Nobuteru
 Ikoma Ienaga
 Maeda Gen'i
 Tokugawa Ieyasu

Others (cont.)
 Murai Sadakatsu
 Nakagawa Kiyohide
 Takayama Ukon
 Tsutsui Junkei
 Wada Koremasa
 Yamauchi Kazutoyo
 Asano Nagamasa
 Hachisuka Hikoemon
 Ishida Mitsunari
 Murai Nagato
 Tsutsui Junkei
 Sakon Shima
 Kuroda Kanbei
 Yamanuchi Katsutoyo
 Horio Mosuke
 Kitabatake Toshikatsu
 Maeno Suemon
 Tōdō Takatora
 Akada Shigeyoshi
 Akada Shigetaka
 Aochi Shigetsuna
 Atagi Nobuyasu
 Chō Tsuratatsu

Others (cont.)
 Endō Taneshige
 Fukutomi Hidekatsu
 Gotō Takaharu
 Hachiya Yoritaka
 Hatakeyama Sadamasa
 Hayashi Shinjiro
 Hirate Norihide
 Horiuchi Ujiyoshi
 Ikai Nobusada
 Inaba Masashige
 Kaganoi Shigemochi
 Kanemitsu Masayoshi
 Katō Yoshiaki
 Kawajiri Hidetaka
 Kotsokuri Tomomasa
 Kyōgoku Takatsugu
 Maeba Yoshitsugu
 Maeda Toshiharu
 Maeno Nagayasu
 Mikumo Shigemochi
 Takigawa Kazumasu 
 Sakuma Nobumori
 Yasuke

Clan castles

Castles of Nobunaga's Residence
 Nagoya Castle
 Kiyosu Castle
 Komakiyama Castle
 Gifu Castle
 Azuchi Castle

Prominent castles and commanders
 Tamaru Castle : Oda Nobukatsu
 Nagahama Castle : Hashiba Hideyoshi
 Sakamoto Castle : Akechi Mitsuhide
 Fukuchiyama Castle : Akechi clan
 Kameyama Castle : Akechi clan
 Kuroi Castle : Akechi clan (Saitō Toshimitsu)
 Shōryūji Castle : Hosokawa Fujitaka
 Sawayama Castle : Niwa Nagahide
 Maebashi Castle : Takigawa Kazumasu
 Shigisan Castle : Matsunaga Hisahide

References

Information on the Oda clan's background 

 
Japanese clans
Daimyo